The United Diving Instructors (UDI) is the diver training organization founded in 1983 by Z. Fisher and H. G. Golzing in California, United States.

Kids programs
 Junior Diver *
 Junior Diver **
 Junior Diver ***

Recreational diving certifications
 Pool Diver
 Basic Diver
 Open Water Diver
 Advanced Open Water Diver
 Special Diver

Specialty courses

UDI provide a range of specialty courses, examples of which include:
 Orientation and Compass Diver
 Night Diver
 Deep Diver
 Rescue Diver
 Dry-Suit Diver
 Drift Diver
 Mountain Lake Diver
 Cave Cavern Diver
 Ice Diver
 Diving Technician
 Compress Diver
 Wreck Diver
 Mixed Gas Diver
 Apnea Diver

Professional certifications
 Open Water Instructor *
 International Instructor **
 Staff Instructor ***
 Honorary Master Instructor ****

See also

External links
Official site
Czech official site

Underwater diving training organizations